Spruce Knob–Seneca Rocks National Recreation Area is a national recreation area in the Monongahela National Forest of eastern West Virginia.

The national recreation area protects three prominent West Virginia landmarks:
 Spruce Knob, the highest point in West Virginia (and the highest of the Allegheny Mountains) with a summit elevation of 4,863 feet (1482 m).
 Seneca Rocks, a 900-foot (270 m) high quartzite crag popular with rock climbers.
 Smoke Hole Canyon, a canyon along the South Branch Potomac River.

Spruce Knob–Seneca Rocks National Recreation Area was established by an act of the U.S. Congress on September 28, 1965, as the first national recreation area in a United States National Forest, so it is administered by the U.S. Forest Service.

See also
Ketterman, West Virginia

References

External links

 Spruce Knob-Seneca Rocks National Recreation Area official site

Protected areas of Grant County, West Virginia
National Recreation Areas of the United States
Protected areas of Pendleton County, West Virginia
Protected areas of West Virginia
Protected areas established in 1965
1965 establishments in West Virginia